Free Throw is an American emo band from Nashville, Tennessee. They are signed to Triple Crown Records.

History
Free Throw was formed in April 2012 after the members had graduated high school and had met each other through the Nashville music scene while playing in previous bands. Vocalist Cory Castro described it as "a couple of beers and a couple of ideas". The band has since released four full-length albums, titled Those Days Are Gone, Bear Your Mind, What's Past is Prologue, and Piecing It Together. They have also released three EPs, titled Free Throw, Lavender Town, and Missing Pieces. After the release of their debut album, the band embarked on a tour opening for Empire! Empire! (I Was a Lonely Estate).

Musical style and lyrics
Free Throw's music has been described as emo, punk rock, pop punk, post-hardcore and indie rock. In an interview, vocalist Cory Castro defined the term "emo" as "taking your emotions and wearing them on your sleeve." The vocalist described the band's sound as being derived from "underground punk emo" bands such as Snowing and Algernon Cadwallader, while also citing Fall Out Boy and My Chemical Romance as influences on the band's "pop sensibility". Lyrical themes often include topics such as alcoholism, addiction, relationship issues, and body image.

Vocalist Cory Castro is an avid fan of the Pokémon video game franchise, and several of the band's song titles are direct references to the series. Examples include Lavender Town, Pallet Town, Cerulean City, Better Have Burn Heal, Worry Seed, and Tail Whip, Struggle. The frontman has a Poké Ball tattooed on his wrist.

Members
Current band members
Cory Castro - lead vocals, rhythm guitar (2012–present)
Jake Hughes - rhythm guitar, backing vocals (2013–present)

Justin Castro - bass (2012–present)
Zach Hall - drums, backing vocals (2013-2015, 2022 - Present)
Lawrence Warner - lead guitar (2012–present)

Former band members
Wes Winslett - rhythm guitar (2012-2013)
Tim Casey - drums (2012-2013)
Kevin Garcia - drums, backing vocals (2015–2022)

Discography
Studio albums
Those Days Are Gone (2014)
Bear Your Mind (2017)
What's Past Is Prologue (2019)
Piecing It Together (2021)
EPs
Free Throw (2012)
Lavender Town (2014)
Missing Pieces (2018)

References

Musical groups from Nashville, Tennessee
Count Your Lucky Stars Records artists
Triple Crown Records artists